The water polo at the 2019 Summer Universiade in Naples has been played between 2 and 14 July. 20 water polo teams participated in the tournament.

Medal summary

Medal table

Medal events

Qualification
Following the FISU regulations, the maximum of 12 teams in water polo events where the number of entries is larger than the authorised participation level were selected by:
 The entry and the payment of guarantee.
 Those 5 teams finishing top rankings of the previous edition will be automatically qualified.
 Those 3 teams finishing bottom rankings of the previous edition will be replaced by new applying teams.
 The host is automatically qualified
 The remaining teams will be selected by wild card system according to geographical, continental representation, FISU ranking and FINA ranking.

Men's tournament

Women's tournament

Venues
Five swimming pools have been selected to host the Universiade (three for the competitions and two as training facilities):
Stadio del Nuoto, Caserta: men's preliminary round and quarterfinals.
Piscina comunale Alba Oriens, Casoria: women's preliminary round and quarterfinals.
Piscina Felice Scandone, Naples: semifinals and finals.
Training pools:
PalaDennerlein, Naples (men).
Piscina Comunale, Santa Maria Capua Vetere (women).

Draw
Draws for team sports competitions were held on 5 April 2019 in Naples. According to FISU regulations, draw of pools was based on the following criteria:
 Previous Summer Universiade results
 Participation in previous Summer Universiades
 Continental representation
 FINA rankings

Men's tournament

Women's tournament

Pools composition

References

External links
2019 Summer Universiade – Water polo
Results book – Water polo (Archived version)

 
U
2019 Summer Universiade events
2019 Summer Universiade
2019